WCW All Nighter is a series of late night specials that aired on TBS.

WCW All Nighter (March 6, 1994)
Originally aired March 6, 1994 from midnight until 6am. All matches except for one on this broadcast were from previous editions of Clash of the Champions.

The event was hosted by Tony Schiavone, Bobby Heenan, Gene Okerlund, Chris Cruise, Gordon Solie, Eric Bischoff, and Larry Zbyszko, from Schiavone's house.

Matches showcased were:
 Ric Flair (c) vs. Sting for the NWA World Heavyweight Championship from Clash of the Champions I
 Ric Flair (c) vs. Ricky Steamboat in a two-out-of-three falls match for the NWA World Heavyweight Championship from Clash of the Champions VI
 Lex Luger (c) vs. Ric Flair for the NWA United States Championship from Clash of the Champions XII
 Ric Flair vs. Terry Funk  in an "I Quit" match from Clash of the Champions IX
 Ric Flair and Sting vs. The Great Muta and Terry Funk in a Thunderdome match from Halloween Havoc (1989)
 Ric Flair and Barry Windham vs. The Midnight Express (Bobby Eaton and Stan Lane) from Clash of the Champions IV
 Shane Douglas and Ricky Steamboat (c) vs. Brian Pillman and Steve Austin for the NWA World Tag Team Championship and WCW World Tag Team Championship from Clash of the Champions XXII
 Steve Austin vs. Brian Pillman from Clash of the Champions XXV
 The Road Warriors (Hawk and Animal) vs. The Samoan Swat Team (Samu and Fatu) from Clash of the Champions VIII
 Enforcers (Arn Anderson and Larry Zbyszko) (c) vs. Dustin Rhodes and Ricky Steamboat for the WCW World Tag Team Championship from Clash of the Champions XVII
 Cactus Jack vs. Van Hammer from Clash of the Champions XVII

Dave Meltzer of the Wrestling Observer reviewed the first special favorably, writing, "all the announcers were pretty funny and the matches, most shown in their entirety, were mainly classics". According to Meltzer, the Nielsen rating for the special was 1.2 and impressed TBS enough to consider making it an annual event.

WCW All Night 2

Originally aired at midnight on Saturday morning January 21, 1995. In June 2010, the show became available as part of WWE Classics on Demand. The show was added to the WWE Network September 12, 2019 as a Hidden Gem.

The show opened with Tony Schiavone, Bobby Heenan, Larry Zbyszko, Gene Okerlund, Gordon Solie and Dusty Rhodes in the Omni Hotel in Atlanta.

During the broadcast, they counted down the 10 best Clash of the Champions matches:
10 - Steve Austin (c) vs. Ricky Steamboat for the WCW United States Heavyweight Championship from Clash of the Champions XXVIII
9 - Big Van Vader (c) vs. Davey Boy Smith for the WCW World Heavyweight Championship from Clash of the Champions XXIV
8 - 
7 - 
6 - Steve Austin vs. Brian Pillman from Clash of the Champions XXV
5 - Enforcers (Arn Anderson and Larry Zbyszko) (c) vs. Dustin Rhodes and Ricky Steamboat for the WCW World Tag Team Championship from Clash of the Champions XVII
4 - 
3 - Arn Anderson and Tully Blanchard (c) vs. Sting and Dusty Rhodes for the NWA World Tag Team Championship from Clash of the Champions II
2 - Ric Flair vs. Terry Funk in an "I Quit" match from Clash of the Champions IX
1 - Ric Flair (c) vs. Sting for the NWA World Heavyweight Championship from Clash of the Champions I

In between matches 9 and 8, a match between The Gladiators vs. The Mulkeys was shown from World Championship Wrestling, March 30, 1987. They then showed Hulk Hogan (c) vs. Ric Flair for the WCW World Heavyweight Championship in a steel cage match from Halloween Havoc (1994).

In between matches 5 and 4, Ric Flair & Barry Windham vs. Eddie Gilbert & Ricky Steamboat was shown from World Championship Wrestling January 21, 1989. This was followed by Ric Flair vs. Ricky Steamboat from WCW Main Event July 24, 1994.

In between matches 3 and 2, The Road Warriors (Animal and Hawk) vs. The Steiner Brothers (Rick Steiner and Scott Steiner) from Starrcade 1989 was shown.

In between matches 2 and 1, Sting vs. Lex Luger for the WCW World Heavyweight Championship from SuperBrawl II was shown.

References

1994 American television series debuts
TBS (American TV channel) original programming
World Championship Wrestling shows
1995 American television series endings